The Columbia Country Club, located in Chevy Chase, Maryland, is the successor of the Columbia Golf Club, which was organized on September 29, 1898 by nine men. Originally there were twenty members. The golf course, which opened in 1911, was designed by Herbert Barker. The first location of the Club was on the east side of Brightwood Avenue, afterwards known as Georgia Avenue, in the neighborhood of Schuetzen Park.  Through its history, the club has counted among its members two Five Star Generals, Omar Bradley and Hap Arnold, along with countless politicians (most notably Barack Obama), journalists, CEOs and lobbyists.

History
The present site on Connecticut Avenue was purchased in 1909 from the Chevy Chase Land Company. The certificate of incorporation is dated August 25, 1909. The design of Frederick B. Pyle for the club house was selected from among four submitted. The golf course, completed in 1911, was designed by Herbert Barker, a noted golfer and course architect of the day. Walter Travis made extensive renovations to the course in 1915. Although there is no newspaper record of the event, the opening of the new Club occurred on January 6, 1911. Early Club minutes were lost. The course was one of the favorite courses of President Woodrow Wilson.

The U.S. Open was held at the Club in 1921, won by Englishman, Jim Barnes. President Warren Harding presented the Champion's Trophy.  With the exception of the eighth hole, there have been changes on all holes of the course. Several acres were added to the original  in the 1930s.  Other improvements, such as new tee boxes and a better irrigation system, were added in the early part of 2012.

The first swimming pool (donated by Donald Woodward) opened in 1925. The Olympic-sized pool was built much later and the entire area was totally renovated in 1978. A profusion of tennis courts have existed from the beginning of the Club. Platform tennis courts were added in the 1960s. Major changes have been made on the 15th, 16th and 17th holes of the golf course, made possible by the construction of a water line through the area by the WSSC under its power of eminent domain. In addition, 2009 saw the completion of a major renovation and addition of the club house, adding an indoor swimming facility, upgraded fitness center, new bowling alley (duckpin), locker rooms, ice skating rink (winter only) and additional parking among other things. Throughout its rich history, only three head golf professionals ever worked at the club, Fred McLeod, William Strausbaugh, and Robert Dolan (its current head PGA Professional).

The course

The Columbia course favors shotmaking and finesse over the ability to drive the ball long distances.  The natural topography of the area means that Columbia's course is very hilly, with tight fairways and small, undulating greens that are almost universally sloped back to front.  Course superintendents generally keep the Columbia greens at a very high speed, and rarely do they roll anything less than an 11 on the Stimp meter.

A common saying among members and caddies is that "there are only two flat lies at Columbia, on the tee and in your pocket".  Because of the layout, driving the ball long distances can often get a player into trouble due to deep rough, side-hill lies, pot bunkers, and the aforementioned tight fairways.  Almost every approach shot on the golf course plays significantly either uphill or downhill, including severe downhill plays on #2, #5, #12, #14, #15, and #16.  Hole #17 at Columbia is a truly unique hole, with only a 200-yard tee shot required to a short but wide section of fairway.  From there, the player must chip straight uphill only 70 yards to a green sloped from front to back.

The signature hole, however, remains the par 3 16th, which, legend has it, served as Bobby Jones's inspiration for the 12th hole at Augusta National Golf Club.  From one of three tee boxes, the hole plays to a very long, narrow green with three distinct levels that is guarded completely along the front by a large pond.  Complicating matters are two pot bunkers, one in front of the green and one behind.  The hole has been consistently rated among the best in the area, and was ranked by Washingtonian magazine locally.

Overall, the par 70 (35-35) course measures  in length, with a course rating of 72.3 and slope rating of 139.

References

External links

 
 Official Town of Chevy Chase History
 August 2009 Washington Examiner Article about the golf course

1911 establishments in Maryland
Buildings and structures in Montgomery County, Maryland
Chevy Chase (CDP), Maryland
Golf clubs and courses in Maryland
Sports venues completed in 1911
Tourist attractions in Montgomery County, Maryland